Janusz Minkiewicz (born June 25, 1914 in St. Petersburg – May 29, 1981 in Warsaw) was a Polish writer, translator, journalist and satirist.

Born in St. Petersburg, he graduated from the faculty of philosophy of the Warsaw University. Active in various journals, he was considered one of the heirs to the Skamander group of poets. In 1939 he fled Nazi-occupied part of Poland to Vilna, then under Lithuanian occupation, where in 1940 (after the Soviet take-over of the city) he ran a satirical theatre, as well as the "Ksantypa" cabaret in Biały Sztral cafe. Following the German take-over of the city in 1941 he moved back to Warsaw, where he collaborated with numerous officially-approved theatres. After the war he became a noted translator of literature, mostly Russian. He collaborated with satiric journals Szpilki, Przekrój and Cyrulik Warszawski.

References 

 Literatura polska. Przewodnik encyklopedyczny, tom I, PWN, Warszawa 1984
 Lesław Bartelski, Polscy pisarze współcześni 1944-1970, Agencja Autorska, Warszawa 1972

1914 births
1981 deaths
Writers from Warsaw
Polish male writers
University of Warsaw alumni
Recipients of the State Award Badge (Poland)